Acrocercops diacentrota is a moth of the family Gracillariidae, known from West Bengal, India. It was described by Edward Meyrick in 1935. The hostplant for the species is Michelia champaca.

References

diacentrota
Moths of Asia
Moths described in 1935